Rockwood Music Hall is a music venue at 196 Allen Street on the Lower East Side of Manhattan in New York City. Owner Ken Rockwood, aka "The Professor",  opened the establishment in 2005 as a small bar and music venue. Today, the venue features three stages (2 larger rooms upstairs and one smaller room downstairs). Rockwood also has a record label,  Rockwood Music Hall Recordings, which was founded in 2013. 

Artists who have performed at Rockwood include Sara Bareilles, Sting, Norah Jones, Lady Gaga, Between Giants, FREDO, Jessie J,  John Gallagher, Jr., Giselle Bellas, Mumford & Sons, and Billie Joe Armstrong.

References

External links
 

Lower East Side
Nightclubs in Manhattan
Music venues in Manhattan
Drinking establishments in Manhattan
Music venues completed in 2005
2005 establishments in New York City